Events from the year 1546 in France.

Incumbents
 Monarch – Francis I

Events

Births

Full date known
Anne d'Escars de Givry, clergyman (born 29 March, died 1612)

Full date missing
Philippe Desportes, poet (died 1606)
Pierre de L'Estoile, diarist and collector (died 1611)
Nicolas de Harlay, seigneur de Sancy, soldier and diplomat (died 1629)
Pierre de La Primaudaye, writer (died 1619)
Jacques Le Bossu, theologian (died 1626)
Madeleine de l’Aubespine, aristocrat (died 1596)

Deaths

Full date known
Francis, Count of Enghien (born 1519, died 23 February)
Étienne Dolet, scholar, translator and printer (born 1509, executed 3 August)

See also

References

1540s in France